Andrea L. Kieffer (born January 1964) is a Minnesota politician and former member of the Minnesota House of Representatives. A member of the Republican Party of Minnesota, she represented District 53B, which includes the cities of Woodbury and Landfall in Washington County in the eastern Twin Cities metropolitan area. She is also a nonprofit volunteer.

Education
Kieffer graduated from the University of Minnesota's Carlson School of Management in Minneapolis, earning her B.S. in Business Management.

Minnesota House of Representatives
Kieffer was first elected to the House in 2010 and was re-elected in 2012. She announced on November 6, 2013 that she would not seek re-election in 2014.

She was one of only 4 Republican representatives to vote in favor of the same-sex marriage bill passed by the House on May 9, 2013.

Personal life
Active in her community, she is a member of Minnesota Excellence in Public Service, the Woodbury Chamber of Commerce, the Woodbury Children’s Hospital Association and the Woodbury Community Foundation.

Kieffer previously lived overseas in Budapest, Hungary, and in Singapore. While in Budapest, she served as a school board member of the American International School of Budapest, as chair of the Parent-School Association, as a board member of the North American Women’s Association, and as a board member of the Youth Compass. While in Singapore, she was a member-at-large of the Parent-Teacher Association and a member-at-large of the International Women’s Association.

References

External links

 Andrea Kieffer official Minnesota House of Representatives website
 Andrea Kieffer official campaign website
 Project Votesmart - Rep. Andrea Kieffer Profile

1964 births
Living people
American expatriates in Hungary
American expatriates in Singapore
Carlson School of Management alumni
People from Woodbury, Minnesota
Republican Party members of the Minnesota House of Representatives
Women state legislators in Minnesota
21st-century American politicians
21st-century American women politicians